Falcitornoceras is a goniatitid ammonite from the Late Devonian, early Famennian, that has been found in France and Spain.  Falcitornoceras was named by House and Price, 1985, and is the type genus for the subfamily Falcitornoceratinae.

The shell of Falcitornoceras is strongly involute, lacking an umbilicus. Juvenile stages have falcate ribs which cross the ventral rim; the ventro-lateral area bears weak to strong furrows.  The adventitious lobe, high on the flank, is rounded or subacute and the lateral lobe has an inconspicuous saddle at the umbilical seam.

Falcitornoceras is slightly older than Gundolficeras and somewhat younger than Phoenixites, close relatives, although temporally overlapping both.

Distribution
Devonian of France, Poland and Spain.

References
Notes

 Falcitornoceras in GONIAT Online 6/9/12

Tornoceratidae
Goniatitida genera
Late Devonian ammonites
Ammonites of Europe
Famennian life
Famennian genus first appearances
Famennian genus extinctions